Beitar Nes Tubruk Netanya, formerly Beitar Netanya, is a football club in Netanya, Israel.

History

Beitar Netanya
The original Beitar Netanya team spent several years in the lower divisions, mainly in the second division there the club played from 1961–77, 1981–82 and in 1986 the club was promoted to the top division (then Liga Leumit) as Liga Artzit champions. However, the club won only three games in its first and only season in the top flight, and were relegated with just 10 points, the lowest ever total during a 16-team season.

At the end of the 1991–92 Liga Artzit season the club was relegated to the third tier and then disbanded in 1993. The club rights were sold to a group of Israeli businessmen.

Beitar Nes Tubruk
Arik Izikovich, with the help of National team manager Shlomo Scharf had re-founded the club as a feeder team in the hope of transferring young Israeli players to European clubs and improving the national team.

Sponsorship
The club relies heavily on transfer fees and loan arrangements.  The annual budget is generally around 3 million shekels, with about a third of that budget coming from Ya'akov Shahar of Maccabi Haifa ($130,000 for the first option on two under-21 players) and Meir Shamir ($100,000).

Honours

League

Cups

1As Beitar Netanya

Notable former players

Gad Machnes (born 1956)
 Vicky Peretz (1953–2021)

Notable former managers

From Beitar Netanya
Yehoshua Feigenbaum
Shmulik Perlman

From Beitar Nes Tubruk (Youth)
Beni Lam
Gad Machnes (born 1956)

Notes

External links
Official Website
Official page on IFA

 
Sport in Netanya
Tobruk
Netanya
Association football clubs established in 1939
1939 establishments in Mandatory Palestine